Lavon Coleman (born December 10, 1994) is an American football running back who is a free agent. He played college football at Washington.

Professional career

Houston Texans
Coleman was signed by the Houston Texans as an undrafted free agent on May 11, 2018. He was waived on September 1, 2018.

Seattle Seahawks
On September 3, 2018, Coleman was signed to the Seattle Seahawks practice squad. He was released on October 23, 2018.

Green Bay Packers
On October 31, 2018, Coleman was signed to the Green Bay Packers practice squad. He was promoted to the active roster on December 22, 2018. He was waived on May 6, 2019.

Seattle Dragons
In October 2019, Coleman was selected by the Seattle Dragons during the open phase of the 2020 XFL Draft. He was waived during final roster cuts on January 22, 2020.

References

External links
Green Bay Packers bio
Washington Huskies bio

1994 births
Living people
American football running backs
Washington Huskies football players
Houston Texans players
Seattle Dragons players
Seattle Seahawks players
Sportspeople from Santa Barbara County, California
Green Bay Packers players
Players of American football from California
People from Lompoc, California